is a Japanese manga series written and illustrated by Hiyoko Kobayashi. It was serialized in Kodansha's Weekly Young Magazine from July 2012 to January 2020, with its chapters compiled into 18 tankōbon volumes. A three-episode original animation DVD (OAD) adaptation was produced by Hoods Entertainment and released from October 2015 to November 2016. By March 2020, Hantsu × Trash had over 1.7 million copies in circulation.

Premise
Yōhei Hamaji is a high school student who is considered trash for being unpopular with the girls. He is recruited by Nakajima, a perverted upperclassman, to join the school's water polo team, under the premise that they get to do co-ed practice with the girls team and can touch them all they want during those sessions. Hamaji is berated by the girls' star player Chisato Hagiwara, but develops a crush on her because she is one of the girls who actually cares about him. He then tries to take water polo seriously to try to win her heart.

Characters

 A first-year high school boy who is recruited into the water polo team. He initially does so just to get the girls but falls in love with Chisato, and tries to better himself.

 A second-year student and star of the girls water polo team. She takes the sport seriously, but cannot stand the pervertedness of the boys team. Her manga profile describes her as a bit clumsy personality and inexperienced when it comes to relationships.

 A second-year student and member of the water polo team. He is usually seen wearing sunglasses and is always unashamedly perverted, ogling the girls and talking about having had sex with them in his fantasies many times over.
 
 A handsome second-year student who was a former water polo star in middle school. He is not interested in being on the high school team but is interested in Chisato.

 Chisato's teammate. She has a crush on Chisato and joined the water polo team because of it.

 A former star player of the high school's water polo team, Miyoshi is a university student who volunteers with the school as an assistant coach. She is especially attracted to virgins, hoping to take their first times, but at the school she mainly directs her efforts at the oblivious Hamaji.
 
 Chisato's water polo teammate with short dark hair and known for her "rocket breasts". She attracts the affection of Shioda, one of the water polo boys, but finds him somewhat annoying.

 A pretty and shy first-year student who was part of the track team but did not want to run anymore because she was self-conscious of her large chest. She joins the water polo team because of Hamaji, and falls in love with him. She tries to be his girlfriend, but becomes discouraged when she finds he has feelings for Chisato.

Media

Manga
Kodansha collected its chapters in 18 tankōbon volumes, released from January 4, 2013, to March 6, 2020.

Volume list

Original Animation DVD
An original video DVD (OAD) produced by Hoods Entertainment was bundled with the eigth volume of the manga on October 6, 2015. A second OAD was bundled with the 10th volume of the manga on June 6, 2016. A third OAD was bundled with the 11th volume of the manga on November 4, 2016.

Reception
By March 2020, Hantsu × Trash had over 1.7 million copies in circulation.

See also
Peridot, another manga series by the same author
Oku-sama wa Joshi Kōsei, another manga series by the same author

References

External links
 

Hoods Entertainment
Kodansha manga
OVAs based on manga
Seinen manga
Sex comedy anime and manga
Water polo in anime and manga